Saara is a village and a former municipality in the district of Altenburger Land, Thuringia, Germany.

History
The municipality of Saara was established on January 1, 1996, through the consolidation of the former municipalities Lehndorf (containing the village Saara), Mockern, Podelwitz, Taupadel, and Zehma. Since 31 December 2012, it is part of the municipality Nobitz.

References

Former municipalities in Thuringia